Martin Hardie (1875-1952) was painter, printmaker, writer and museum curator.

Born in London, Hardie was an expert on watercolours, and painted many himself. He was a member of the Royal Watercolour Society.

In 1921 Hardie was appointed Keeper of the Department of Prints and Drawings at the Victoria & Albert Museum, a position he kept until his retirement in 1935. James Laver, who worked under him, described him as 'the most considerate of chiefs, the most helpful of guides, the most delightful of friends' and said 'his is a refined and delicate talent founded upon good draftsmanship and an exquisite sense of atmosphere'.

In July 1925 he exhibited 6 works in the Fifth Annual Exhibition of the Australian Painter-Etchers’ Society, held at Art Gallery, Education Department, Sydney, NSW., (Catalogue of the Fifth Annual Exhibition of the Australian Painter-Etchers' Society, July 1925)

Published writing
 Watercolour Painting in Britain, posthumously published in 3 volumes between 1966 and 1968.
Volume I: The Eighteenth Century (1966), London: B. T. Batsford
Volume II: The Romantic Period (1967), London: B. T. Batsford
Volume III: The Victorians (1968), London: B. T. Batsford

References

1875 births
1952 deaths
20th-century English male artists
English male painters
Painters from London